Ochlockoneee is an unincorporated community in western Leon County, Florida, United States, located at U.S. Route 90 and County Road 260 (Geddie Road) and at the Ochlockonee River, west of Tallahassee by three miles (4.8 km).

The community includes the neighborhoods around Chigger Lane, Houston Road, and Sassy Tree Lane. Ochlockonee is bordered on the north and south by the Lake Talquin Recreation Area.

Government
Ochlockonee is included in Leon County Commission District 2.

U.S. Postal Code: 32304

History
The community name derives from Muskogean for "yellow water."

Sources

Unincorporated communities in Leon County, Florida
Tallahassee metropolitan area
History of Leon County, Florida
Unincorporated communities in Florida